Alexandre Obolensky (1952–2018) was a Belgian painter, scenic designer and exhibition designer.

Obolensky was born in Brussels in 1952. He graduated from the Institut Saint-Luc in 1970. From 1978 he was employed as a set painter by La Monnaie, becoming an independent artist and designer in 1982. As a freelancer he worked for various theatres, ballets and operas, in several different countries, including the Théâtre du Rond-Point in Paris. Together with François Schuiten he produced a number of murals, including La Tour Infinie in Louvain-la-Neuve (2010). The pair also worked together for Expo 2000 in Hanover and Expo 2005 in Aichi, and designed the exhibition space of Train World in Schaarbeek.

References

1952 births
2018 deaths
20th-century Belgian male artists
21st-century Belgian male artists